A Toast to Those Who Are Gone is a 1986 compilation album of recordings that Phil Ochs made in the early to mid-1960s, mostly between his contracts with Elektra Records and A&M Records. In line with recordings made on the former, Ochs espouses his left-leaning views on civil rights on songs like "Ballad of Oxford", "Going Down To Mississippi" and "Colored Town", his views on worker's rights on "No Christmas in Kentucky", his attack on the American Medical Association on "A.M.A. Song", and the unwilling hero (perhaps Ochs himself) on the title track.

The CD carried an extra track, "The Trial", and the liner notes were by noted Ochs fan Sean Penn.

Track listing
All songs by Phil Ochs.
"Do What I Have to Do" – 2:36
"The Ballad of Billie Sol" – 2:24
"Colored Town" – 3:00
"A.M.A. Song" – 2:17
"William Moore" – 3:07
"Paul Crump" – 3:34
"Going Down To Mississippi" – 3:04
"I'll Be There" – 2:10
"Ballad of Oxford (Jimmy Meredith)"  – 2:51
"No Christmas in Kentucky" – 3:04
"A Toast to Those Who Are Gone" – 3:31
"I'm Tired" – 2:20
"City Boy" – 1:58
"Song of My Returning" – 5:17
"The Trial" – 2:44
 Bonus track on CD only

Personnel
Phil Ochs – guitar, vocals
A. N. Other – bass, piano, guitar, mandolin

References

Phil Ochs compilation albums
1986 compilation albums
Rhino Records compilation albums